Songs of Faith and Devotion is the eighth studio album by English electronic music band Depeche Mode. It was first released on 22 March 1993 in the United Kingdom by Mute Records and a day later in the United States by Sire Records and Reprise Records. The album incorporated a more aggressive, darker rock-oriented tone than its predecessor Violator (1990), largely influenced by the emerging alternative rock and grunge scenes in the United States.

Upon its release, Songs of Faith and Devotion reached number one in several countries, and became the first Depeche Mode album to debut atop the charts in both the UK and the US. To support the album, Depeche Mode embarked on the fourteen-month-long Devotional Tour, the largest tour they had undertaken to date.

Recording the album and the subsequent tour exacerbated growing tensions and difficulties within the band, prompting Alan Wilder to quit in 1995, making this album the final one with him as a band member, and also the final album of the band to be recorded as a quartet. The ordeal had exhausted their creative output following the enormous success they had enjoyed with Violator, leading to rumours and media speculation that the band would split. Depeche Mode subsequently recovered from the experience, and released Ultra in 1997.

Background and recording

Techniques and processes
Songs of Faith and Devotion was recorded over eight months in a rented villa in Madrid during 1992, as well as later sessions in Hamburg and London. Following his work on U2's seventh studio album, Achtung Baby, producer Flood suggested the idea of building their own studio in a rented house where the band would live and work, the same process having yielded huge successes for U2. A studio was set up in the basement of the villa, with two drum kits using different spaces to achieve different sounds. The recordings from the kits could then be processed through synthesizers, such as the large Roland System 700 the band had installed in the studio. The band had become aware of getting caught in easy routines in the studio leading to boredom and thus wanted to change as many aspects to their approach to the recording as possible.

Wilder recalled on Violator the band had relied heavily on sequencing; though the album used a great deal more live recorded audio than previous Depeche Mode releases, the audio had been quantised to the exact beats of the bars, resulting in a slick but sequenced feel. For making Songs of Faith and Devotion, the band wanted the sound to be looser and less programmed. Tracks such as "I Feel You" included drums performed live by Wilder which were then sampled and sequenced to form drum loops using Cubase, in a different structure to how they were originally performed, keeping all the dynamics and inherent mistakes of a human performance. Embellishments like reversed cymbals were added later at the behest of Wilder, who often suggested such experimentation.

Further techniques used in recording included the reversed piano on the outro to the track "Mercy in You". The introduction of the track "Judas" has uilleann pipes recorded with reversed reverberation mixed into the sound, to achieve a haunting, atmospheric feel. "Walking in My Shoes" included a piano part which was processed through a guitar processor to add distortion. A harpsichord sample was then played and recorded over the top, giving a unique, layered sound to the riff. Early demos for "Condemnation" included all four band members performing in the same space—Andy Fletcher bashing a flight case with a pole, producer Flood and Dave Gahan clapping, Alan Wilder playing a drum and Martin Gore playing an organ. The sound produced was very embryonic; however, it gave the band a direction as to how the track should sound. Guitars were processed through devices such as Leslie tone cabinets, originally designed for organs, to achieve different sounds.

Recording
Following the success of Violator and the subsequent tour, the band had taken a long break from each other. Upon returning, they found it difficult to collaborate, with several factors contributing to the more difficult atmosphere that the band experienced recording the album. The band living and working together in the same house meant that they rarely got breaks from each other as opposed to previous albums whereby the band would go to work in a studio, and then return to their respective homes or hotels at the end of each day. Fletcher described the band living together as "claustrophobic", and the lack of a break from each other as a factor in contributing to the stress. Gore felt pressured to write tracks that could live up to the success of the previous album, Violator, despite encouragement from Fletcher that he wrote better under pressure. Gahan had moved to Los Angeles following Violator and had been spending time with up and coming alternative rock bands such as Jane's Addiction and Soundgarden, which inspired him to create a rock-oriented record, leading to creative differences with the rest of the band. Not helping was that Gahan was dealing with drugs at this point. The band also began to jam together, something which they had not previously done in terms of album writing, only for fun. The lack of success of coming up with musical ideas from such jams led to intense frustration.

Unlike the previous albums, there was very little pre-production, where the band would listen to demos created by Gore and then suggest ideas to establish a creative framework. Flood recalls the lack of pre-production as a big mistake that adversely affected the early recording sessions. Due to these frustrations, the first recording batch of four weeks was largely unusable, which Wilder described as "a complete fucking waste of time" in a sarcastic toast to Flood at the airport on their way back home. The lack of progress increasingly frustrated everyone involved. Flood compared the collective effort of Violator where the band would contribute as a whole, and while there were disagreements, it was in recognition that it was for a greater good, whereas in the making of Songs of Faith and Devotion, the band members were highly adamant of their own individual ideas, leading to considerable tension. Flood described the atmosphere as "like pulling teeth" and emotionally draining. Gore, Gahan, and Daniel Miller shared his sentiments, comparing the party-like atmosphere of creating Violator to the stale atmosphere on Songs of Faith and Devotion. Though Wilder would say the band members had drifted as far apart as they had ever been, the emotional stress contributed to some of Depeche Mode's best tracks, including "In Your Room" and "Walking in My Shoes", which many felt were indicative of Gore's greatest works.

Gahan downplayed his role on the album, stating the only thing he felt he contributed was what he considers his greatest vocal performance for "Condemnation". Conversely, Wilder praised his role, stating that on previous releases, Gahan's studio contribution was often only vocal performance, and thus did not get in the way much; but during the recording of Songs of Faith and Devotion Dave often offered a lot of positive encouragement, and Wilder's creative differences with Gore were actually the real source of the tension in the band. Flood recalls Wilder and Gore having a very heated argument over the mix to "Judas", and that there were constant disagreements throughout the recording process between the members of the band and Flood himself. Despite the feeling the band were realising one of their greatest works, Flood commented that the "little things" of the recording process never ran smoothly, leading to constant, largely non-constructive, arguing. Conditions improved between the band when the recording sessions moved to Hamburg, largely in part as it was a return to normal studio routine, as opposed to living together.

It was during the recording of the album that Wilder decided he had to leave the band, although he wouldn't leave until after the subsequent tour. Wilder later was comparing the friction between the members of The Beatles during the recording of The White Album to conditions working on Songs of Faith and Devotion: "we were in the worst possible state as members but we were creating some of our best work. The stories I hear about them [The Beatles] not being even in the same room together – that was very much the same with us, when one person would be in the studio and the other would be in another city, and then the next day that person would come and do their vocal and you'd go away, because you couldn't bear to be in the same room. ... at the time, it was a living hell. During the making of that album, I really made a decision to leave the group; even though I didn't leave until two or three years later, I remember thinking 'I'm never going to make another record under these circumstances again, because it's so much not fun'. And music should be fun – there should be some sort of enjoyment there."

The album was mixed at the Olympic Studios in London by Wilder, Flood and Mark "Spike" Stent.

Artwork
Overlapping each image of the band members is a symbol representing that member, in a similar style to Led Zeppelin's fourth studio album. The symbols first appeared on the cover of lead single "I Feel You", which did not feature the band members, and as such, each featured its member's birthdate in the right-hand corner to identify the member.

Reception

Songs of Faith and Devotion became Depeche Mode's first studio album to reach number one on both the UK Albums Chart and the US Billboard 200. It also topped the charts in Austria, Belgium, France, Germany and Switzerland.

The album received largely positive reviews from critics and peers of Depeche Mode. The Guardian critic Adam Sweeting dubbed Songs of Faith and Devotion an "astonishingly powerful album" and a "masterpiece". David Quantick of NME called it "a very fine record indeed", while Jon Pareles of The New York Times wrote that "the songs make desire more desperate, and more alluring, than ever". A mixed review came from Rolling Stones Arion Berger, who wrote that the album "documents how Depeche Mode's savvy justifies its worst instincts; like the band itself, it's gloomy, pretentious and winning." Robert Christgau of The Village Voice assigned the album a "dud" rating. In a retrospective review, Ned Raggett of AllMusic stated that "Songs of Faith and Devotion continues the Depeche Mode winning streak", and in 1999, he ranked the album at number 18 on his list of "The Top 136 or So Albums of the Nineties" for Freaky Trigger. Q later included it on their list of "In Our Lifetime: Q's 100 Best Albums", along with Violator.

Band member Alan Wilder stated he felt "In Your Room" and "Walking in My Shoes" as some of the best works the band had ever done, a sentiment agreed upon by producer Flood, who commented that "many people" involved in the project shared such sentiments. Fellow musician Gary Numan also stated that Songs of Faith and Devotion was the album that saved his career, noting, "[after listening to this album] [my] music changed dramatically. It became much darker. At school I was excused from religious instruction because I had no faith and Songs of Faith and Devotion suddenly gave me something to write about and something to be bothered about. [...] I love Depeche Mode, always will."

Tour
The subsequent Devotional Tour to support the album was the largest Depeche Mode had undertaken to that point. The tour spanned fourteen months, visiting twenty-seven countries and played to over two million people over 158 dates. The tour covered 100,000 miles and required 90 tonnes of equipment. The huge scale of the tour was to cover the sponsoring costs. Anton Corbijn designed the elaborate stage design, the first time he had ever done so. The huge scale of the tour took its toll on the band members. Despite Fletcher's comment that "Dave was loving it [the tour]...he was on a different planet", his heroin addiction had increased, Gore was drinking excessively and had several seizures, Fletcher was suffering from clinical depression to the point where he was replaced by Daryl Bamonte on all dates from April and the grueling nature of touring had taken its toll on Wilder. Gore later commented, "I don't think anyone was ever the same after that tour", highlighting the tense nature of the tour, and Q magazine would later refer to the Devotional Tour as "the most debauched rock tour ever".

Following the tour, the experience of Songs of Faith and Devotion and the subsequent supporting tour had taken too hard a toll on Wilder, who announced his departure from the band on his 36th birthday in 1995, highlighting a highly uneven workload distribution, lack of acknowledgement from his bandmates, creative differences within the band and overall lack of cohesion. Wilder's departure and the internal strife within the band, specifically Gahan's growing heroin addiction led many to speculate that the band was finished. The band managed to recover from the loss of Wilder, releasing Ultra in 1997.

2006 re-release
A collector's edition of Songs of Faith and Devotion was released in 2006, including a bonus DVD. It was released as part of the second wave of reissues—along with A Broken Frame and Some Great Reward. The first CD was remastered and was released on a CD/SACD hybrid except for in the US where the remastered first disc was pressed to standard CD. The bonus DVD includes a 5.1 surround mix of the original album, the B-Side "My Joy" and the Jazz Mix of "Death's Door" (basically an extended mix of the original version), as well as several other remixes.

Also included was a 36-minute documentary on Songs of Faith and Devotion titled Depeche Mode: 1991–94 (We Were Going to Live Together, Record Together and It Was Going to Be Wonderful), named after a quote from Wilder on the potential of living in their Madrid-area recording studio. It features interviews with Depeche Mode (including Wilder, who would leave the band in 1995) and other important Depeche Mode-related figures like Daniel Miller, Anton Corbijn and Daryl Bamonte. There is also footage from the film Devotional and the music videos. The documentary mainly focuses on the extreme difficulty of recording the album, and the even more frustrating fourteen-month tour that followed.

It was released on 2 October 2006 in the UK and 3 October 2006 in the US. The remastered album was released on vinyl on 2 March 2007 in Germany and on 5 March 2007 internationally.

Track listing
All lead vocals by Dave Gahan, except where noted.

Personnel
Credits adapted from the liner notes of Songs of Faith and Devotion.

Depeche Mode
 Andrew Fletcher
 David Gahan
 Martin Gore
 Alan Wilder

Additional musicians
 Bazil Meade – additional vocals 
 Hildia Campbell – additional vocals 
 Samantha Smith – additional vocals 
 Steáfán Hannigan – uilleann pipes 
 Wil Malone – string arrangements, strings conducting

Technical
 Depeche Mode – production, mixing
 Flood – production, mixing
 Mark Stent – mixing
 Steve Lyon – engineering
 Chris Dickie – engineering
 Paul Kendall – engineering
 Jeremy Wheatley – engineering assistance
 Marc Einstmann – engineering assistance
 Shaun de Feo – engineering assistance
 Volke Schneider – engineering assistance
 Kevin Metcalfe – mastering
 Daryl Bamonte – album coordination

Artwork
 Anton Corbijn – visuals, art direction, sleeve design
 Area – sleeve design

Charts

Weekly charts

Year-end charts

Certifications and sales

See also
 List of UK Albums Chart number ones of the 1990s
 List of European number-one hits of 1993
 List of number-one albums of 1993 (U.S.)

References

Bibliography

External links
 
 Album information from the official Depeche Mode website
 Official remaster info

1993 albums
Albums produced by Flood (producer)
Depeche Mode albums
Mute Records albums
Reprise Records albums
Sire Records albums